Callavia is an extinct, monotypic genus of trilobite arthropods. C. broegeri lived during the late Atdabanian stage, which lasted from 530 to 524 million years ago during the early part of the Cambrian Period in what are today Canada and the United States.

Taxonomy 
The position of Callavia in relation to other Olenellina has shifted repeatedly over time. Initially it was assigned to the Holmiinae by Pierre Hupé, and was later moved back and forth to the Callaviinae. Lieberman, however, argues Callavia is a basal member of the Judomioidea.

Reassigned species 
 C. brevioculata = Nevadella cartlandi 
 C. burri = Pleisionevadella burri
 C. callavei = Callavalonia callavei
 C. cartlandi = Nevadella cartlandi 
 C. cobboldi = Nevadella cartlandi 
 C. eucharis = Nevadella eucharis
 C. hastata = Callavalonia callavei
 C. lotzei = Sdzuyomia lotzei
 C. perfecta = Nevadella perfecta

Distribution 
C. broegeri is known from the Lower Cambrian of Newfoundland (Brigus Formation, Branchian Series, Conception Bay), Nova Scotia (between Docters Brook and Malignant Brook, northernmost Antigonish Highlands), Canada, and Massachusetts, USA (Weymouth Formation, Pearl street, North Weymouth, Mill Cove, Norfolk County).

Ecology 
C. broegeri occurs together with lampshells Sunnaginia imbricata and Eccentrotheca kanesia, and 
the agnostid Serrodiscus bellimarginatus.

See also
Nevadella

References 

Olenellina
Cambrian trilobites
Fossils of Canada
Fossils of the United States
Monotypic arthropod genera
Paleontology in Newfoundland and Labrador
Paleontology in Nova Scotia
Paleozoic life of Nova Scotia